Lemyra moltrechti is a moth of the family Erebidae. It was described by Tsunekata Miyake in 1909. It is found in Taiwan.

References

moltrechti
Moths described in 1909